Marko Perović may refer to:

 Marko Perović (footballer, born 1972), former Serbian international football player
 Marko Perović (footballer, born 1984), Serbian nacional football team (Assistant).